Neo-Theosophy is a term, originally derogatory, used by the followers of Helena Blavatsky to denominate the system of Theosophical ideas expounded by Annie Besant and Charles Webster Leadbeater following the death of Madame Blavatsky in 1891. This material differed in major respects from Blavatsky's original presentation, but it is accepted as genuinely Theosophical by many Theosophists around the world.

Main innovations of post-Blavatsky Theosophy as expounded by Besant and Leadbeater were the focus on exploring past lives and the astral plane using clairvoyance, the promotion of the young Indian boy Krishnamurti as the vehicle of the coming "World Teacher" and the introduction of Catholicism and its religious rituals in the form of the Liberal Catholic Church.

Overview
After Blavatsky died in 1891, William Quan Judge became involved in a dispute with Henry Steel Olcott and Annie Besant over Judge allegedly forging letters from the Mahatmas. As a result, he ended his association with Olcott and Besant during 1895 and took most of the Society's American Section with him. He managed his new organization for about a year until his death in New York City, whereupon Katherine Tingley became manager. The organization originating from the faction of Olcott and Besant is based in India and known as the Theosophical Society - Adyar, while the organization managed by Judge is known nowadays simply as the Theosophical Society, but often with the specification, "international headquarters, Pasadena, California."  The Theosophical Society - Adyar is the group denounced as Neo-Theosophy by those who are followers of William Q. Judge and the original teachings of Madame Blavatsky; they do not accept what they regard as the Neo-Theosophical teachings of Annie Besant, Henry Olcott, and C. W. Leadbeater.

The term Neo-Theosophy was coined by Ferdinand T. Brooks around 1912 in a book called Neo Theosophy Exposed, the second part of an earlier book called The Theosophical Society and its Esoteric Bogeydom. Around 1924, Margaret Thomas published a book called Theosophy Versus Neo-Theosophy. This book, now available online, presents a detailed critical comparison of Blavatskyian Theosophy and Neo-Theosophy.

G. R. S. Mead who was also highly critical of the clairvoyant researches of Besant and Leadbeater, remaining loyal to Blavatskyian Theosophy, also used the term Neo-Theosophy to refer to Besant's movement.  For him "Theosophy" meant the wisdom element in the great world religions and philosophies.

Later, the term Neo-Theosophical came to be used outside Theosophical circles to refer to groups formed by former Theosophists as well as groups whose central premises borrow heavily from Blavatskyian Theosophy. Robert S. Ellwood, in his 1973 book Religious and Spiritual Groups in Modern America referred to organizations that had been formed by former Theosophists as "devolutions of Theosophy" and included in his survey "Neo-Gnostic groups and Neo-Rosicrucian groups [...] the Anthroposophy of Rudolf Steiner, [...] Alice Bailey's groups, (Guy Ballard's) "I AM" Activity and Max Heindel's Rosicrucianism. In a later book, Alternative Altars (1979) Professor Ellwood added;

The author Daryl S. Paulson associates "Neo-Theosophy" with Alice Bailey.

Other neo-Theosophists include Steiner's contemporary Peter Deunov and Samael Aun Weor, who introduced theosophical teachings to Latin America.  Dion Fortune and Aleister Crowley were also influencers of (and influenced by) the leading edge of the theosophical movement, which in turn influenced Anton LaVey's Satanism, L. Ron Hubbard's Scientology, Wicca, and the modern New Age and New Thought movements. (Alice Bailey introduced the term New Age).

Neo-Theosophists today 

Some examples of Neo-Theosophists today include  Benjamin Creme, Douglas Baker and Victor Skumin.

In 1990, Skumin elaborated on the theosophical conceptions of spiritual evolution and proposed a classification of Homo spiritalis (Latin: spiritual man), the sixth root race, consisting of eight sub-races (subspecies) – HS0 Anabiosis spiritalis, HS1 Scientella spiritalis, HS2 Aurora spiritalis, HS3 Ascensus spiritalis, HS4 Vocatus spiritalis, HS5 Illuminatio spiritalis, НS6 Creatio spiritalis, and HS7 Servitus spiritalis. 

According to Victor Skumin, *Anabiosis spiritalis is spirituality in the potential of unmanifest accumulations of personality, the charge of the fires of spiritual creation.

Sub-races of Homo spiritalis:
Scientella spiritalis is the cordial presentiment of the presence and demands of the spirit, spiritualization of the fire of centers, glimpses of self-consciousness of a spiritual person; 
Aurora spiritalis is the imperative of the spirit, the action of the spiritual fire of the centers in the heart, the kindling of the fire of the spirit, the formation of the orientation of the personality to the spiritual improvement of life; 
Ascensus spiritalis is the dawn of spiritual aspirations, the action of the fire of the spirit in the heart, searching spiritual work, aspiration of self-consciousness to merge with the One Spirit; 
Vocatus spiritalis is the maturation of spiritual accumulations, the purposeful spiritual creation, self-awareness and realization of a person as a warrior of the spirit; 
IIluminatio spiritalis is the beginning of the fiery transmutation, the lighting of the achievement fire; revealing the identity of man - the earthly carrier of the Thoughts of the One Spirit; 
Creatio Spiritalis is the beginning of fiery creation, the action of the fire of achievement in the heart, the  revealing self-consciousness of man as the earthly carrier of the Light of the One Spirit; 
Servitus Spiritalis is the carrying a consciously accepted duty-commission, the synthesis of spirituality in the clarity of knowledge of a fiery man.

See also

References

External links 
 Theosophy Versus Neo-Theosophy - online version of Margaret Thomas's book.

Video
 

Theosophy
Esotericism
Religious belief systems founded in the United States